The 2018 Hobart International was a women's tennis tournament played on outdoor hard courts. It was the 25th edition of the event and part of the WTA International tournaments of the 2018 WTA Tour. It took place at the Hobart International Tennis Centre in Hobart, Australia from 7 through 13 January 2018.

Points and prize money

Point distribution

Prize money

1 Points per the WTA.
2 Qualifiers prize money is also the Round of 32 prize money
* per team

Singles main-draw entrants

Seeds

1 Rankings as of 1 January 2018.

Other entrants
The following players received wildcards into the singles main draw:
  Eugenie Bouchard
  Lizette Cabrera
  Jaimee Fourlis

The following players received entry using a protected ranking:
  Anna-Lena Friedsam

The following players received entry from the qualifying draw:
  Kirsten Flipkens
  Kurumi Nara
  Monica Niculescu
  Nina Stojanović 
  Alison Van Uytvanck
  Heather Watson

Withdrawals
Before the tournament
  Shelby Rogers → replaced by  Beatriz Haddad Maia

During the tournament
  Kirsten Flipkens
  Monica Niculescu

Doubles main-draw entrants

Seeds

1 Rankings as of 1 January 2018.

Other entrants 
The following pairs received wildcards into the doubles main draw:
  Alison Bai /  Lizette Cabrera
  Jaimee Fourlis /  Jessica Moore

Withdrawals 
During the tournament
  Kirsten Flipkens

Champions

Singles

  Elise Mertens def.  Mihaela Buzărnescu, 6–1, 4–6, 6–3

Doubles

 Elise Mertens /  Demi Schuurs def.  Lyudmyla Kichenok /  Makoto Ninomiya, 6–2, 6–2

References

External links
Official website

 
Hobart International
Hobart International
Hobart International
Hobart International